The American Samoa records in swimming are the fastest ever performances of swimmers from American Samoa, which are recognised and ratified by the American Samoa Swimming Association (ASSA).

All records were set in finals unless noted otherwise.

Long Course (50 m)

Men

Women

Short Course (25 m)

Men

Women

References

External links
 ASSA web site

American Samoa
Records
Swimming
Swimming